Mons Arntsen Løvset (18 August 1891 – 7 April 1972) was a Norwegian businessman, newspaper editor and politician for the Conservative Party.

Biography
He was born at Byneset in Sør-Trøndelag, Norway. His parents were Arnt Løvset (1873-1938) and Helle Håve (1870-1911). He was raised on the Æli farm in the parish of Børsa which his father acquired in 1899 and which he took over from 1922. He attended vocational school where he studied business. He was editor of the newspaper Fosen Blad in Trondheim  from  1933 until 1941 when publication was stopped by authorities during the  German occupation of Norway. He served as chairman of the board   of Børsa Kaiselskap from 1939 to 1957. He also served as chairman of the board of  the Orkla wood processing plant (Orkla Trekonstruksjon og Impregnering) at Orkanger from 1961.

Løvset was a member of Børsa municipality council between 1947 and 1953.
He was elected to the Norwegian Parliament from Sør-Trøndelag from 1950 to 1961.

References

1891 births
1972 deaths
People from Sør-Trøndelag
Norwegian editors
20th-century Norwegian businesspeople
Conservative Party (Norway) politicians
Members of the Storting
20th-century Norwegian politicians